Humanae may refer to :

Dignitatis Humanae is the Second Vatican Council's Declaration on Religious Freedom.
Humanae Vitae is an encyclical written by Pope Paul VI and promulgated on July 25, 1968.
The Speculum Humanae Salvationis was a bestselling anonymous illustrated work of popular theology in the late Middle Ages.